Henry Oge O'Neill, also spelt as Henry Og O'Neill, may refer to:

Henry Og O'Neill, son of Conn Mor O'Neill, king of Tyrone
Henry Og MacShane, son of Henry MacShane O'Neill